Sāma is composition of words in Rigvedic hymns from notes. The hymns of Rigveda form the base of Sāmagāna. Sāmagāna is not merely a name given to singing hymns of Veda but represents the philosophy and science of uniting thought, sound and music. Sāmagāna is purpose of creation of Samaveda.

Sāma Veda
Sāma is singing of hymns from Rigveda alone and not from other Veda-s. "richi adhyoodham sama" ऋचि अध्यूढ्रम साम (Chhandog Upnishad 1.6.1). Hence Sāma is composition of words in Rigvedic hymns into notes. The richā-s or hymns of Rigveda are called yoni or ādhāra as they form the base of Sāmagān. In musicological parlance Sāma Veda has taken mātu (words) from Rigveda and provided dhātu (notes) to these words. (Bharatiya Sangeet Ka Itihaas. Dr. Thakur Jaidev Singh. Calcutta: Sangeet Research Academy, 1994, pp. 35 – 72)

Parts of Sāma Veda
Ārchika.आर्चिक् Only a few hymns in Sāma Veda Samhita were not based upon richa-s taken from Rigveda. The bulk being based on Rigveda is known as Ārchika. It has two parts.

Poorvārchika. पूर्वार्चिक 585 Richa-s are sub-grouped into 6 Prapāthaka-s. Each Prapāthaka has two Ardha-s. Each Ardha has 10 Dashati-s. A collection of ten (here, hymns) is called a Dashati.

Uttarārchika. उत्तरार्चिक It has 1225 richa-s contained in 9 Prapāthaka-s, first five having two ardha-s each and the remaining four having three ardha-s each.

Āranyaka Samhita. अरण्यक सम्हिता It is merely a collection of verses that could be sung.

Branches of Sāma
Patanjali's statement, "sahasravartma samvedaha" सहस्रवर्त्म समवेदः gives rises to speculation that there were a thousand branches of Sām, while he poetically indicated there could be a thousand ways in which Sāma could be sung. In 'Sāmatarpana' there are a maximum of 13 Āchārya-s but today there are only three branches.
1. Rān#aneeya राणानीय
2. Kouthumeeya कौथ्हुमीय
3. Jaimineeya जैमिनीय

Relationship of Ārchika and Gāna-grantha
Ārchika grantha (treatises) contains hymns that are yoni or base to Gāna or singing. The collections of suitably modified richa-s are known as Gāna-grantha. These are the true Sāma.
Sāma created on richa-s of Poorvārchika are called Grāma-gāna,ग्रामगान् Grāmegeya-gāna, ग्रामगेयोगान् Prakriti-gāna प्रकृतिगान or Veya-gāna वेयगान्.
Sāma created on richa-s of Āranyak Samhita are termed Aranya-gāna अरण्यागान or Aranyageya-gāna अरण्यगेयोगान्.
Sām created on richa-s of Uttarārchik are known as Ooha-gāna.ऊहगान्
The Sanskrit root ooh means 'to modify according to need'. (Caland in preface to PanchaVimshaBrahmin)

Application of Gāna-s
Gramgeyo-gāna: Sung in villages or towns.
Aranyageya-gāna: Practiced in solitude of forest. Also called Rahasyageyo-gān.
Ooh-gān: Pragatha-s specially created for yajna on basis of Gramgeyo-gāna.
Oohya-gāna ऊह्यगान: Pragath-s created for yajna on basis of Rahasyageyo-gāna.

There is a difference in number of songs attributed to different branches. Shri Satvalekar in preface to Sāmaveda Samhita has given the following table of songs.

Grām or Scale of Sāmaveda
Fox Strangways in Music of Hindustan says, "Vocal scales are conceived downwards. They are so conceived, because the telling notes of the voice in its upper register, and this presents itself, therefore as the starting point for a vocal scale." The Sāyana#-bhāshya (critique) on Sāma-vidhāna Brāhmana establishes that note of Sāma were of nidhana prakriti (diminishing nature) and followed a descending order.

Swara of Sāma
In Naradiya Shiksha the seven notes of Sāma are First, Second, Third, Fourth, Mandra, Krushta and Atiswāra. This indicates that initially only three or four notes were used for Sāmagāna.
Ārchika songs were sung on the basis of just one note, e.g. Sa Sa Sa, or Ni Ni Ni. This kind of chanting was well suited to Havana, Mantra-pātha and Japa
Gāthik songs were hymns in praise of deities and used two notes, e.g. Ni Ni Ni Ni, Sa Sa Sa Sa.
Sāmic songs for the first time used three notes. The word Sāmic is taken to mean three notes. The songs were like Ga Ga Re Re Sa Sa Sa.

Apart from these three basic notes, the singers came across a fourth which they called Swarāntara. When they discovered a note lower than the lowest known note they called it Mandra. When a still lower note than Mandra was found they called it Atiswāra. A higher note determined was called Krushta after Sanskrit root Krush (to scream, speak loudly). So the complete Sāmic Saptaka in descending order contains:

To preserve the Sāmik notes, Raga Sāmeshwari was created. Dr. Lalmani Misra first translated the notes M G R S D N P into Shadja gram—S N D P G M R—and then created a Raga which is performed in the evening.

Shruti Jāti
Shruti-jāti is defined as the way in which a particular note could be applied to make the song appealing. There are five with individual signs for three shruti-jāti-s.

Rishis
A Rishi in Rig Veda is an author of a Rik, a hymn mantra, derived from oral tradition and direct insight, not from reasoning or intellect. The term Rishi is defined as "rishati jnānena samsāra-pāram” meaning one who goes beyond the mundane world by means of knowledge. Further, some scholars think the root 'drish' (sight) might have given rise to root 'rish' meaning 'to see'.

Sri Aurobindo described Shruthi as "divine recordings of cosmic sounds of truth" heard by the Rishis. The Vedas are thus Shruthis, revealed scriptures.

The Rig Veda contains 10,552 hymns; grouped into 1,028 Sukthas each of roughly ten mantras, spread over ten Mandalas (Books). The Mandalas are of differing sizes. These mantra songs are authored by some 400 Rishis of whom about 30 were women.

Certain texts called Anukramani (also called Anukramanika) serve as Index to the Rig Veda and provide information about each hymn of the Rig Veda. The most well-known of the Aukramani is Katyayana’s sarvanukramani and is dated around the 2nd century.

See also
 Swara

References

Sources
 Thakur Jaidev Singh (1994). Bharatiya Sangeet Ka Itihaas. Calcutta: Sangeet Research Academy
 Fox-Strangways (1914). Music of Hindostan. Oxford: Clarendon Press
 Lalmani Misra (1973). Bharatiya Sangeet Vadya
 Lalit Kishor Singh (1954). Dhwani Aur Sangeet. New Delhi: Bharatiya Jnanpith

External links
 Swar in Samveda. An Article by Dr. Lal Mani Misra on Samic musical notes

Ancient Indian culture
Hindu mythology
Hindu texts
Hindustani music
Sanskrit texts
Vedas